The 531st Tactical Fighter Squadron is an inactive United States Air Force unit, last assigned to the 3rd Tactical Fighter Wing at Bien Hoa Air Base, South Vietnam.   The squadron was inactivated on 31 July 1970.

History

World War II

Activated in Hawaii in 1941 as the 58th Bombardment Squadron (Light), a Bombardment/Reconnaissance squadron, being equipped with a mixture of B-18 Bolos, second-line P-26s, and A-20 Havocs.   Was part of the air defense forces of Hawaii, many aircraft being destroyed during the Pearl Harbor Attack at Hickam Field.   Re-equipped with A-24 Dauntless dive bombers in 1942, remained in Hawaii as an air defense squadron until 1943.

Re-designated as a fighter-bomber squadron in mid-1943, deploying to the Central Pacific in 1944 as part of the 21st Fighter Group.   Returned to Hawaii and re-equipped with long-range P-38 Lightnings and returned to combat operations in the Central Pacific, operating from Iwo Jima beginning in early 1945 until the end of the war in August.    Remained as part of Twentieth Air Force in the Marianas until inactivated in October 1946.

Cold War

Reactivated in 1953 at George AFB, California as an F-86 Sabre Fighter-Bomber Squadron.  Spent about a year under Tactical Air Command training, deploying to France in 1954 as part of the NATO buildup of the United States Air Forces in Europe during the early years of the Cold War.  Operated from several bases in France during the 1950s, inactivated in 1958 as part of a USAFE reorganization.

Became part of PACAF in 1958, operated F-100 Super Sabres from Misawa AB, Japan as an air defense squadron.

Viet Nam War
Deployed to South Vietnam, 1965 and carried out combat operations until inactivated in 1970.

Lineage
 Constituted as the 58th Bombardment Squadron (Light) on 22 November 1940
 Activated on 1 January 1941
 Redesignated 58th Bombardment Squadron (Dive) on 19 October 1942
 Redesignated 531st Fighter-Bomber Squadron on 14 August 1943
 Redesignated 531st Fighter Squadron on 18 February 1944
 Inactivated on 10 October 1946
 Redesignated 531st Fighter-Bomber Squadron on 15 November 1952
 Activated on 1 January 1953
 Inactivated on 8 February 1958
 Redesignated 531st Tactical Fighter Squadron on 19 May 1958
 Activated on 1 July 1958
 Inactivated on 31 June 1970

Assignments
 Hawaiian Air Force (later Seventh Air Force), 1 January 1941
 21st Fighter Group, 15 June 1944 – 10 October 1946
 21st Fighter-Bomber Group, 1 January 1953 – 8 February 1958
 21st Tactical Fighter Wing, 1 Ju1y 1958
 39th Air Division, 18 June 1960
 3rd Tactical Fighter Wing, 16 December 1965 – 31 July 1970

Stations

 Hickam Field, Hawaii, 1 January 1941
 Bellows Field, Hawaii, 18 March 1941
 Hickam Field, Hawaii, 29 April 1941
 Bellows Field, Hawaii, 11 December 1941
 Wheeler Field, Hawaii, 19 December 1941 – 18 June 1943
 Canton Island, Phoenix Islands, 24 June 1943
 Makin Island, Gilbert Islands, 18 December 1943
 Bellows Field, Hawaii, 1 March 1944
 Kualoa Field, Hawaii, 21 April 1944
 Mokuleia Field, Hawaii, 8 October 1944

 Central Field (Iwo Jima), 26 March 1945
 South Field (Iwo Jima), 15 July 1945
 Isely Field, Saipan, 5 December 1945
 Northwest Field (Guam), 17 April – 10 October 1946
 George Air Force Base, California, 1 January 1953
 Toul-Rosieres Air Base, France, 28 November 1954
 Chambley-Bussières Air Base, France, March 1955
 Misawa Air Force Base, Japan, 1 July 1958 (deployed to Da Nang Air Base, South Vietnam, 1 February – 13 July 1965)
 Bien Hoa Air Base, South Vietnam, 16 December 1965 – 31 July 1970

Aircraft

 Boeing P-26 Peashooter, 1941
 Douglas B-18 Bolo, 1941
 Douglas A-20 Havoc, 1941–1942
 Douglas A-24 Dauntless, 1942–1944
 Lockheed P-38 Lightning, 1944–1946

 North American F-86 Sabre, 1953–1958
 North American F-100 Super Sabre, 1958–1970

References

Notes
 Explanatory notes

 Citations

Bibliography

 
 
 
 

Fighter squadrons of the United States Air Force